Toronto West was a federal electoral district in the City of Toronto, Ontario, Canada, that was represented in the House of Commons of Canada from 1904 to 1925.  This riding was created in 1903 when West Toronto riding was renamed, and reduced from electing two members of the House of Commons to one.

Toronto West initially consisted of the portion of the city of Toronto east of Palmerston Avenue and north of Queen Street West. In 1914, the riding was redefined to consist of the portion of the City of Toronto bounded by Queen Street West, Spadina Avenue, Bloor Street West and Dovercourt Road.

The electoral district was abolished in 1924 when it was redistributed between Toronto South and Toronto West Centre ridings.

Electoral history

|-
  
|Conservative
| OSLER, Edmund Boyd  
|align="right"|4,464
  
|Liberal
|HUNTER, Alfred Taylour 
|align="right"| 2,573    

|-
  
|Conservative
|OSLER, Edmund Boyd
|align="right"| 4,772 
 
|Independent
|DUTHIE, James Hunter
|align="right"|2,419    

|-
  
|Conservative
| OSLER, Edmund Boyd  
|align="right"| 11,442
  
|Liberal
|WALDRON, Gordon 
|align="right"| 3,437   

|-
  
|Government
|HOCKEN, Horatio Clarence 
|align="right"| 12,648 
  
|Opposition
|KERR, Charles Wesley 
|align="right"|3,030 

|Labour
|BRUCE, John William 
|align="right"|2,053    

|-
  
|Conservative
|HOCKEN, Horatio Clarence  
|align="right"| 5,920 
  
|Liberal
|HUNTER, Alfred Taylour  
|align="right"| 3,913 

|Labour
|PRENTER, Harriet Dunlop
|align="right"| 1,741

See also 
 List of Canadian federal electoral districts
 Past Canadian electoral districts

External links 
 Website of the Parliament of Canada

Former federal electoral districts of Ontario
Federal electoral districts of Toronto